Jürgen Brandt (19 October 1922 – 26 July 2003) was a German general and Chief of Federal Armed Forces Staff from 1978 until 1983.

External links
Biography on BMVg website

1922 births
2003 deaths
Inspectors General of the Bundeswehr
Bundeswehr generals
Generals of the German Army
Place of birth missing